Patrington railway station is a disused railway station on the North Eastern Railway's Hull and Holderness Railway in Patrington, East Riding of Yorkshire, England. It was opened by the Hull and Holderness Railway on 27 June 1854. The station was closed to passengers on 19 October 1964.

References

 
 

Disused railway stations in the East Riding of Yorkshire
Railway stations in Great Britain opened in 1854
Railway stations in Great Britain closed in 1964
Former North Eastern Railway (UK) stations
Beeching closures in England
Hull and Holderness Railway